Heena (1997 - June 11, 2005) was a police dog of the Mumbai Police, India. Heena was a sniffer Labrador trained by the police to sniff out explosives. The high point of his career was the detection of RDX explosives in a BEST bus in the suburb of Andheri. He successfully identified hidden explosives in the bus which would have otherwise killed many in Mumbai's crowded streets. He was honoured for this act by the police who gave him a rank of one of their own.

His long hours with the Mumbai Police Force took a toll on him and he died due to kidney failure.

See also
Zuyaqui - a Mexican police dog.
List of individual dogs

External links
 Telegraph India article

1997 animal births
2005 animal deaths
Individual dogs